{{DISPLAYTITLE:HGe 4/4 II}}

The HGe 4/4 II is a combined adhesion and cogwheel-equipped electric locomotive used on a number of metre gauge railways in Switzerland since 1985.

An initial series of five prototypes was procured by a consortium made up of the Furka Oberalp Bahn (FO) and the SBB-CFF-FFS, which wanted them for the Brünigbahn, now known as the Zentralbahn (zb).  Once the type had been proven, the members of the consortium ordered a total of 11 series production units, and the Brig-Visp-Zermatt-Bahn (BVZ) ordered another five such units.

The class is so named because it was the second class of locomotives of the Swiss locomotive and railcar classification type HGe 4/4 to be acquired by each of the three railway companies that procured it. According to that classification system, HGe 4/4 denotes a narrow gauge cogwheel-equipped electric locomotive with a total of four axles, all of which are drive axles.

List of locomotives

*) The chassis of locomotives 1951 and 1952 were fitted with new bogies (Abt system) and transformers (11 kV) and delivered to the FO as nos. 104 and 105.  The prototype bogies (Riggenbach system) and transformers (15 kV) salvaged from those chassis were then fitted to the last two series production locomotives delivered to the SBB-CFF-FFS Brünigbahn.

See also 

 History of rail transport in Switzerland
 Rail transport in Switzerland

References

External links
 Matterhorn Gotthard Bahn

This article is based upon a translation of the German language version as at February 2013.

SLM locomotives
Brown, Boveri & Cie locomotives
Bo′Bo′ locomotives
Electric locomotives of Switzerland
11 kV AC locomotives
15 kV AC locomotives
Matterhorn Gotthard Bahn locomotives
Swiss Federal Railways locomotives
Railway locomotives introduced in 1985
Metre gauge electric locomotives